Iron Storm is a studio album by Jamaican reggae band Black Uhuru. It was released in 1991 through Mesa Recordings. The album peaked at number 1 on the US Billboard World Albums chart and was nominated for Grammy Award for Best Reggae Album at 34th Annual Grammy Awards.

Track listing

Personnel 

 Derrick Simpson – lead vocals, composer, producer
 Ived "Sen-C" Campbell – backing vocals
 Tracy Lauren Marrow – guest rap vocals (tracks: 1, 6)
 Leebert "Gibby" Morrison – rhythm guitar
 Steven "Cat" Coore – guitar
 Christopher Meridith – bass
 Derrick Sagittarius Barnet – bass
 Earl "Bagga" Walker – bass
 Anthony Brissett – keyboards, piano
 Noel Davis – keyboards, piano
 David Madden – horns
 Dean Fraser – horns
 Egbert Evans – horns
 Marcus "Rangatan" Smith – drums
 Lowell Fillmore Dunbar – drums
 Christopher "Sky Juice" Blake – percussion
 Don Carlos – producer
 Donny Nguyen – producer
 Garth Dennis – producer
 Michael Angelo Saulsberry – producer
 George Nauful – executive producer
 Jim Snowden – executive producer
 Claire McNally – production assistant
 Jim York – production assistant
 Steve Sykes – mixing
 David Rowe – engineering
 Lynford "Fatta" Marshall – engineering
 Rohan Richards – engineering
 Rudi Ekstein – engineering
 Mark Johnson – assistant engineering
 Howard Alston – coordinator
 Kathleen Covert – art direction & design
 Nancy Nimoy – artwork
 Johnny Black – photography

Charts

References

External links 

1991 albums
Black Uhuru albums